The 2006 Vuelta a Burgos was the 28th edition of the Vuelta a Burgos road cycling stage race, which was held from 6 August to 10 August 2006. The race started in Briviesca and finished in Burgos. The race was won by Iban Mayo of the  team.

General classification

References

Vuelta a Burgos
2006 in road cycling
2006 in Spanish sport